This is a list of Fourierist Associations in the United States which emerged during a short-lived popular boom during the first half of the 1840s. Between 1843 and 1845 more than 30 such "associations" – known to their adherents as "phalanxes" – were established in the United States, all of which met with economic failure and rapid disestablishment within one or a comparatively few years.

The Fourierist movement of the 1840s was one of the four primary branches of secular utopian socialism in the United States during the 19th century, succeeding Owenism (1825–27) while antedating Icarianism (1848–98) and Bellamyism (1889–96).

Background

The communitarian ideas of Charles Fourier (1772–1837) were popularized in the United States in an 1840 book by the American Albert Brisbane as well as through a column by Brisbane in the pages of Horace Greeley's New York Tribune in 1842 and 1843.

The Fourierist movement followed an earlier attempt to remake society through exemplary socialist communities attempted on American soil by Robert Owen from 1825 until 1827. John Humphrey Noyes, a historian of these movements in addition to being a communal leader in his own right, noted the difference in the following way:

<blockquote>The main idea on which Owen and Fourier worked was the same. Both proposed to reconstruct society by gathering large numbers into unitary dwellings. Owen had as clear sense of the compound economies of Association as Fourier had, and discoursed as eloquently, if not as scientifically on the beauties and blessings of combined industry. ... The difference in their methods is this: Owen's plan was based on Communism [communalism]; Fourier's plan was based on the Joint-stock principle.</blockquote>

List

Source: William Alfred Hinds, American Communities. Second edition. Chicago, IL: Charles H. Kerr & Co., 1908; pg. 250. (unless otherwise noted)

See also

 List of Owenite communities in the United States
 Familistère de Guise, a Phalanx in France.
 Falanstério do Saí, Brazilian Phalanx
 Scăieni Phalanstery

Footnotes

Further reading

 T.D. Seymour Bassett, "The Secular Utopian Socialists," in Donald Drew Egbert and Stow Persons (eds.), Socialism and American Life: Volume 1. Princeton, NJ: Princeton University Press, 1952; pp. 153–211.
 Herman J. Belz, The North American Phalanx: An Experiment in Fourierist Socialism, 1843-1855. PhD dissertation. Princeton University, 1959.
 Herman Belz, "The North American Phalanx: An Experiment in Socialism," Proceedings of the New Jersey Historical Society, vol. 81 (Oct. 1963), pp. 215–247.
 Carl J. Guarneri, The Utopian Alternative: Fourierism in Nineteenth-Century America. Ithaca, NY: Cornell University Press, 1991.
 Morris Hillquit, History of Socialism in the United States. [1903] Revised Fifth Edition. New York: Funk and Wagnalls, 1910.
 William Alfred Hinds, American Communities and Co-operative Colonies, Second Edition. Chicago: Charles H. Kerr & Co., 1908.
  John Humphrey Noyes, History of American Socialisms. Philadelphia: J.B. Lippincott & Co., 1880.
 Samuel M. Pedrick, "Sketch of the Wisconsin Phalanx," Proceedings of the State Historical Society of Wisconsin at its 50th Annual Meeting held Dec. 11, 1902. Madison, WI: Wisconsin Historical Society, 1903; pp. 190–226.
 Charles Sears, The North American Phalanx: An Historical and Descriptive Sketch. Prescott, WI: John M. Pryse, 1886.
 Edward K. Spann, Brotherly Tomorrows: Movements for a Cooperative Society in America, 1820-1920.'' New York: Columbia University Press, 1988.

 
Fourierists U.S.

Fourierists U.S.